The Welsh bow or Welsh longbow was a medieval weapon used by Welsh soldiers. They were documented by Gerald of Wales about 1188, who writes of the bows used by the Welsh men of Gwent: "They are made neither of horn, ash nor yew, but of elm.
He reported that the bows of Gwent were "stiff and strong, not only for missiles to be shot from a distance, but also for sustaining heavy blows in close quarters."  He gave examples of the performance of these bows:

	
The powerful Welsh bow may have later been one influence that inspired the creation of the English longbow.

References 

Bows (archery)
Medieval archery
Medieval Wales
History of archery